Ovcharka or ovtcharka may refer to:

Armenian Gampr dog, a landrace dog
Caucasian Shepherd Dog, a breed of dog also known as the Caucasian Ovcharka
Central Asian Shepherd Dog, a breed of dog also known as the Central Asian Ovcharka
South Russian Ovcharka, a large, long-haired white sheepdog
East-European Shepherd, a breed of dog also known as the Byelorussian Ovcharka